FID or fid may refer to:
 Elizabeth Field (Suffolk County, New York), US, IATA code
 Fid, a hollow spike for use in ropework
 The Fid, a mountain in Antarctica
 F.I.D. (album), by Masami Akita
 FID, the country code used by FIDE
 Financial institutions duty, an Australian tax
 Flame ionization detector
 Flight initiation distance
 Foreign internal defense
 Free induction decay
 Fréchet inception distance, image quality metric
 International Federation for Information and Documentation
 Focus-image distance in projectional radiography
 Stop the Decline, an Italian political party